The women's 100 metre backstroke was a swimming event held as part of the swimming at the 1932 Summer Olympics programme. It was the third appearance of the event, which was established in 1924. The competition was held on Tuesday August 9, 1932, and on Thursday August 11, 1932.

Twelve swimmers from seven nations competed.

Medalists

Records
These were the standing world and Olympic records (in minutes) prior to the 1932 Summer Olympics.

In the first semi-final Eleanor Holm set a new Olympic record with 1:18.3 minutes.

Results

Semifinals

Tuesday August 9, 1932: The fastest two in each semi-final and the fastest third-placed from across the semi-finals advanced to the final.

Semifinal 1

Semifinal 2

Semifinal 3

Final

Thursday August 11, 1932: Marie Braun was not able to compete in the final. She had to stay in hospital due to blood poisoning after an infection caused by a mosquito bite.

References

External links
Olympic Report
 

Swimming at the 1932 Summer Olympics
1932 in women's swimming
Swim